Jeremy Herrin is an English theatre director. He is the artistic director of Headlong Theatre.

Career
Having trained at the Royal Scottish Academy of Music and Drama in Glasgow, Herrin was an assistant director under Stephen Daldry at the Royal Court Theatre from 1993 to 1995. He then was a staff director at the National Theatre from 1995 to 1999. In 2000 he became associate director at Live Theatre, Newcastle upon Tyne, where his credits included plays by Richard Bean and Joe Harbot.

His breakthrough show was the critically successful That Face by Polly Stenham at the Royal Court Upstairs in 2007, which subsequently transferred to the West End. He was nominated for the Evening Standard Award for Best Director for Stenham's Tusk Tusk in 2009. He became the deputy artistic director at the Royal Court to Dominic Cooke in 2009. He has directed a number of new plays at the Royal Court including Spur of the Moment by Anya Reiss, Richard Bean's The Heretic and No Quarter, also by Stenham, in 2013.

Herrin made his Shakespearean debut at the Globe Theatre in 2011, directing Eve Best in Much Ado About Nothing. In 2011 Herrin directed several West End productions, including a well received revival of Alan Ayckbourn's Absent Friends. He also directed the UK premiere of David Hare's The Vertical Hour as well as the world premiere and West End transfer of Hare's South Downs. He has directed Roger Allam in Uncle Vanya and in The Tempest at Shakespeare's Globe. He was nominated as Best Director in the 2013 Olivier Awards for his work on This House by James Graham at the National Theatre.

In December 2013 he directed the world premiere of two plays adapted from Hilary Mantel's novels Wolf Hall and Bring Up the Bodies for the RSC. The plays subsequently transferred to The Aldwych Theatre. In 2021 he directed the stage adaptation of Mantel's third novel in the trilogy The Mirror and the Light, which played at the Gielgud Theatre.

In 2013, he succeeded Rupert Goold as the artistic director of Headlong, where he has directed a number of hit productions including Jennifer Haley's The Nether (at The Royal Court Theatre), People, Places and Things by Duncan Macmillan and Labour of Love by James Graham, featuring Martin Freeman and Tamsin Greig in the West End.

In 2022 he will direct Amy Adams, making her West End debut, in a production of Tennessee Williams' The Glass Menagerie.

Philosophy 
Herrin describes himself as the archetypal Royal Court Theatre director, putting the writer before the director:You never want anything onstage that the writer doesn’t like. You need them to be entirely proud. What you want is to give them the deluxe version of their play... I try to disappear into the work. I’d hate for someone to say, in the way they do about other directors, ‘That’s a very Jeremy Herrin production.’ Ego’s a really dangerous thing in theatre. It’s a collegiate enterprise.Herrin has been instrumental in the founding of Stage Directors UK, an organisation that aims to create better working conditions and terms for directors.

Theatre

References

 

Living people
British theatre directors
English theatre directors
1970 births